Gareth is a fictional character from the American television series The Walking Dead and was portrayed by Andrew J. West. Gareth is based on Chris from the comic book series of the same name, according to West himself. Gareth is introduced at the end of season 4. He is initially introduced as the welcoming yet mysterious leader of Terminus. However, his true motivations are revealed after Gareth forces Rick Grimes and his fellow survivors into train car A. At the beginning of season 5, it is revealed Gareth and his entire community are cannibals. As the result of the actions by Carol Peletier, the group escapes, leaving many casualties of Terminus. Gareth, however, leads the remaining survivors to try to hunt down Rick's group and eat them.

Appearances

Season 4 

In the season finale "A," Gareth first appears as the leader of Terminus.  When Rick, Carl, Daryl, and Michonne sneak into Terminus and introduce themselves, Gareth and Alex welcome them.  Gareth then takes them outside to get food from Mary. Rick notices that items from missing members of his group are being used by Terminus residents, so he suddenly slaps a plate of meat out of Alex's hand and takes him hostage. A shootout ensues, resulting in Alex's death, forcing the group to run for cover. After being herded by gunfire through the complex, they are finally pinned down by snipers and forced to surrender. Gareth orders them one-by-one to enter a train car parked nearby, and they are reunited with the rest of the group.

Season 5 

In the season premiere "No Sanctuary," a flashback shows that Gareth, his brother Alex, and several Terminus residents are locked in a train car after being attacked by unknown visitors. Alex regrets putting up the signs that lead to Terminus, while Gareth retorts that they were only being human. Alex then asks him, "What are we now?" In the present, Rick, Daryl, Glenn, and Bob have been rounded up and led into a butchering room to face a trough alongside several other captives, including Sam, two butchers then execute Sam and three other prisoners by bleeding them out. Afterwards, Glenn's death is narrowly averted when Gareth shows up to discuss mundane operations with the butchers and interrogate Rick about the bag of weapons he buried in the woods. As the butchers prepare to kill Glenn, gunfire erupts outside followed by an explosion.  Gareth leaves the room, and Rick takes advantage of the chaos and kills the butchers. As the group fights their way out of Terminus, which is partially destroyed and filling with walkers, Rick shoots Gareth, who is leading some of his men out, in the shoulder. In the episode "Strangers," Rick's group has taken refuge inside a church.  Bob steps outside the church alone and is knocked unconscious by a hooded figure. When he wakes up, he is face to face with Gareth, who explains that he and his group of survivors from Terminus were once normal, but with the destruction of Terminus they have evolved into 'hunters.' It is then revealed that the group cut off Bob's left leg in order to eat it. Gareth casually says, "If it makes you feel any better, you taste much better than we thought you would."

In the episode "Four Walls and a Roof," Bob, laughing hysterically, informs Gareth and the other Terminus survivors that they just consumed tainted meat as he was bitten by a walker (in "Strangers"). While the other members begin to react in horror and vomit, Gareth angrily kicks Bob unconscious and suggests that they will be fine as the meat was cooked. They later leave Bob on the lawn at Father Gabriel's church where the other survivors find him. Bob tells them that the place the Terminus group was at resembled a school and Rick, Sasha, Abraham, Tara, Glenn and Maggie set off to find an old elementary school while Eugene, Rosita, Tyreese, Bob, Carl, and Judith are left behind. Gareth and the Terminus survivors ambush the church and prepare to shoot open the doors to the room they are hiding in after Judith's cry gives away their location. Before they can shoot the doors open, Rick shoots two Terminus members in the head, killing them, revealing that Rick expected the Terminus members would ambush the church once they departed. Rick shoots off two of Gareth's fingers, bringing him to his knees as he pleads with Rick that if he is let go, their paths will never cross again and that he knows what it's like to be hungry. Rick denies the request, knowing that Gareth's group will continue to kill others, and pulls out the red-handled machete that he had previously threatened to kill Gareth with while held captive at Terminus. Rick reminds Gareth of his earlier promise and then hacks Gareth to death with the machete.

Development and reception
Andrew West has stated that the character is based on Chris the hunter from the comic series. Several parallels can be drawn between Gareth's and Chris's character arcs, including similar dialogue, events, and the outfit.

Terri Schwartz of Zap2it commented on the episode "Strangers", saying "surprisingly Father Gabriel Stokes wasn't the biggest arrival in the episode. Though he is a man who -- as is repeatedly said in the series -- clearly has something to hide, it's the reveal that Gareth and the Terminans have turned into the Hunters from "The Walking Dead" comics that is the most skin-crawling, stomach-turning moment in the episode."

References

Fictional cannibals
Fictional mass murderers
Television characters introduced in 2014
The Walking Dead (franchise) characters

fr:Personnages de The Walking Dead#Terminus